The King Alexander's Cup or Friendship Cup was an international football competition contested by the national teams of Romania and Yugoslavia. 
The tournament was named after Alexander I, the King of Yugoslavia and was organized to celebrate the wedding of King Alexander I of Yugoslavia with the Princess Maria of Romania, the event being announced by the Romanian newspaper, Ecoul Sportiv on 28 May 1922: "On the occasion of the marriage of His Majesty King Alexander I with Her Royal Highness Princess Maria of Romania, His Majesty was pleased to donate a cup that will bear his name, to encourage the progress of the football-association sport in his country and in the country of his wife. This cup will be a challenge and will go definitely to the country which will win it three times in a row or five times in total." The 1936, 1937 and 1939 editions were called King Carol's Cup, after Carol II of Romania and the last edition was called King Mihai Cup named after Mihai of Romania. Between 1937 and 1938, the regular Friendship Cup played between Romania and Yugoslavia was extended to include Czechoslovakia for an mini tournament called Eduard Benes' Cup named after Edvard Beneš, the president of Czechoslovakia.

Results

1922

1923

1926

1927

1928

1929

1930

As the King Carol's Cup

1936

1937

1939

As the King Mihai Cup

1940

General statistics

All-time top scorers

1937–38 Eduard Benes Cup
An extended version of the regular Friendship Cup played between Romania and Yugoslavia.

Results

Final Table

Statistics

Goalscorers

References

External links
RSSSF

Defunct international association football competitions in Europe
1922 establishments in Europe
Recurring sporting events established in 1922
Recurring sporting events disestablished in 1940
Football in Romania
Football in Yugoslavia
Romania–Yugoslavia relations